Robert Mackie (7 September 1884 – 1943) was a Scottish professional footballer who played in the Scottish League for Airdrieonians, Third Lanark and Heart of Midlothian as a full back. He also played in the Football League for Chelsea and Leicester Fosse.

Honours 
Heart of Midlothian
 Rosebery Charity Cup: 1903–04

Career statistics

References

1884 births
Scottish footballers
English Football League players
Stenhousemuir F.C. players
Heart of Midlothian F.C. players
Chelsea F.C. players
Leicester City F.C. players
Darlington F.C. players
Airdrieonians F.C. (1878) players
Association football fullbacks
1943 deaths
Third Lanark A.C. players
Albion Rovers F.C. players
Footballers from Stirling
Scottish Football League players